Kurdish phonology is the sound system of the Kurdish dialect continuum. This article includes the phonology of the three largest Kurdish dialects in their respective standard descriptions. Phonological features include the distinction between aspirated and unaspirated voiceless stops, and the large phoneme inventories.

Consonants

  are laminal denti-alveolar , while  are dentalized laminal alveolar , pronounced with the blade of the tongue very close to the back of the upper front teeth, with the tip resting behind lower front teeth.
Kurdish contrasts plain alveolar  and velarized postalveolar  lateral approximants. Unlike in English, the sounds are separate phonemes rather than allophones.
Postvocalic  is lenited to an approximant . This is a regional feature occurring in other Iranian languages as well and called by Windfuhr the "Zagros d".
Kurdish has two rhotic sounds; the alveolar flap and the alveolar trill. While the former is alveolar, the latter has an alveo-palatal articulation.

Kurmanji Kurdish
Distinguishes between aspirated and unaspirated voiceless stops, which can be aspirated in all positions.

Sorani Kurdish
These velarized counterparts are less emphatic than the Semitic emphatic consonants.

Southern Kurdish

Labialization
Kurdish has labialized counterparts to the velar plosives, the voiceless velar fricative and the uvular stop. These labialized counterparts do not have any distinct letters or digraph.

Palatalization
In the same environment,  also becomes .

Pharyngealization
For example, the word  is pronounced as 

Consonants in loanwords
 is a phoneme that is almost exclusively present in words of Arabic origin.
 mostly occurs in words of Arabic origin, mostly in word-initial position.
 is mainly present in Arabic loanwords and it affects the pronunciation of adjacent vowels. The use of the glottal stop in everyday Kurdish may be seen as an effort to highlight its Arabic source.

Vowels
The vowel inventory differs by dialect, some dialect having more vowel phonemes than others. The vowels  are the only phonemes present in all three Kurdish dialects.

Detailed table

Notes

Vowels in loanwords

Glides and diphthongs
All combinations except the last four are present in all three Kurdish dialects.

References

Bibliography

Kurdish language
Iranian phonologies